The Bloch MB.170 and its derivatives were French reconnaissance bombers designed and built shortly before the Second World War. Although the aircraft could have been in service by 1937, debate over what role to give the aircraft delayed deliveries until 1940.

Too few in number to affect the Battle of France, they continued in service with the Vichy forces after the armistice. The MB.174 is notable as the aircraft flown by Antoine de Saint-Exupéry, author of The Little Prince during the campaign. His work  (Flight to Arras), published in 1942, is based on a 1940 reconnaissance mission in this type of aircraft.

Design and development

In 1936, the Ministry for the Air initiated a programme of modernisation of French aviation which included a request concerning a two- or three-seat multi-role aircraft that could be used as a light-bomber or attack aircraft or for reconnaissance. A design team at the former Bloch factory at Courbevoie (which had recently become part of the nationalised SNCASO), led by Henri Deplante, proposed the MB.170, a twin-engined, low-winged cantilever monoplane.

The first prototype, the MB 170 AB2-A3 No.01, equipped as a two-seat attack bomber or a three-seat reconnaissance aircraft, made its maiden flight on 15 February 1938. It was powered by two  Gnome-Rhône 14N radial engines and was armed with a 20 mm Hispano-Suiza cannon in the nose, two 7.5 mm MAC 1934 machine guns in the wing, with another machine gun flexibly mounted in the rear cockpit, with a ventral cupola housing either a rearward firing machine gun or a camera. The second prototype, the MB 170 B3 No.2 was a three seat bomber, with the ventral cupola removed, a revised canopy and larger tail fins.

After many modifications it became the definitive MB.174. After the 50th example was delivered in May 1940, the MB.175 succeeded the MB.174 on the assembly lines in full flow. This bomber version, had a redesigned bomb bay capable of carrying bombs of 100–200 kg (220-440 lb), where the MB.174 was limited to 50 kg (110 lb) bombs. The MB.175's fuselage was lengthened and widened to accommodate this greater capacity but only 25 were delivered before the armistice. They were eventually used in the same reconnaissance units as the MB.174s. The MB.176 was a version with Pratt & Whitney R-1830 radials which proved to have poorer performance than the MB.175. It was ordered into production to ease demand on the French engine manufacturers.

Operational history
The Bloch MB.174 flew for the first time in July 1939 and entered service in March 1940 with strategic reconnaissance units where it replaced the Potez 637 that had proved too vulnerable during the Phoney war. Its first operational mission was flown by the famed pilot and writer,  Antoine de Saint-Exupéry, of  II/33, on 29 March 1940. The Bloch 174 appeared extremely effective in these missions as its speed and manoeuvrability at altitude allowed it to escape from most modern  fighters. Only three examples were lost to enemy fire during the Battle of France. Like the majority of the modern equipment of the  during the campaign, they were too little and too late. At the time of the armistice, most surviving MB.174s and 175s had been evacuated to North Africa. A few were recovered by the Germans and then used for pilot training. During the Vichy period, MB.174s frequently flew over Gibraltar to monitor the British fleet.

In March 1941, German engineers used engines taken from MB.175s (as well as other captured aircraft) to propel the Messerschmitt Me 323 cargo aircraft, some of which flew with parts taken from completed MB.175s. After Operation Torch, French forces defected again from Vichy back to the Allies and surviving examples of the MB.170 flew their final combat missions during the Battle of Tunisia.  They were replaced by reconnaissance variants of the P-38 Lightning and used as transports and target tugs. A final version designed for torpedo bombing, the MB.175T, was built in small series in 1947 and served with the  until 1950.

Variants

MB.170
MB.170.01 - The first prototype, equipped as reconnaissance aircraft, powered by Gnome-Rhône 14N-06 engines.
MB.170.02 - The second prototype, equipped as light bomber, powered by Gnome-Rhône 14N-06 engines.
MB.171
MB.172
MB.173
MB.174
MB.174.01 - The original MB.174 prototype, powered by Gnome-Rhône 14N-49 engines.
MB.174A.3 - Original production version, powered by Gnome-Rhône 14N-49 engines.. 56 built

MB.175
MB.175.01 - The original MB.175 prototype, powered by Gnome-Rhône 14N-48 engines.
MB.175B.3 - Second production version. 23 built, plus 56 unarmed aircraft for the Luftwaffe, powered by Gnome-Rhône 14N-48 engines.
MB.175T
Post-war torpedo bomber version for the Aeronavale. 80 built.
MB.176
MB.176.01 - The original MB.176 prototype, powered by two Pratt & Whitney R-1830 SC 3-G Twin Wasp engines.
MB.176B.3 - Production version. 5 built
MB.177
Single prototype, powered by two Hispano-Suiza 12Y-31 inline engines.
MB.178
Further development, construction halted by arrival of German forces.

Operators

 French Air Force ( Groupes de Reconnaissance 1/33, 2/33, 1/52 and 2/36)
 French Navy''

 Luftwaffe (captured)

Specifications (MB.174A.3)

See also

References

Notes

Bibliography

External links
 Dassault official home page

MB.170
1930s French bomber aircraft
1930s French military reconnaissance aircraft
Low-wing aircraft
Aircraft first flown in 1938
Twin piston-engined tractor aircraft